The A4540 is a ring road in Birmingham, England, also known as the Middle Ring Road, or the Middleway. Birmingham City Centre is the area within this ring road. The ring road was planned and designed by Herbert Manzoni. It is now simply known as the Ring Road due to the removal of the old Inner Ring Road.

The traffic island at Dartmouth Circus houses a preserved Boulton and Watt steam engine, the Grazebrook beam engine. The Middleway forms the boundary to Birmingham Clean Air Zone.

Plans to make The Middleway a red route were proposed as early as 2008 but dropped in 2021.

Route

The A4540 covers the following route: –
 Dartmouth Circus (Roundabout with Aston Expressway and A38 Lichfield Rd) (Pedestrian subway through roundabout)
 Dartmouth Middleway
 Ashted Circus (junction with A47—with pedestrian subway island)
 Lawley Middleway (with Curzon Circus in the middle)
 Garrison Circus (junction with Garrison Lane)
 Watery Lane Middleway
 Bordesley Circus (junction with A45)
 Bordesley Middleway
 Camp Hill Circus (junction with A41 Stratford Road)
 Highgate Middleway
 Haden Circus (junction with A4167 and A435)
 Belgrave Middleway
 Belgrave Interchange (junction with A441 followed by A38) Main road passes underneath interchange
 Lee Bank Middleway
 Islington Row Middleway
 Five Ways Island (junction with A456 which passes underneath island.) Original plans showed the A4540 as passing under the roundabout but this was later changed, a move which is commonly viewed as a mistake and would have alleviated the heavy congestion at the island. The former Broad St section of the A456, which runs under the island, was downgraded in the 1990s. (Pedestrian subway through island)
 Ladywood Middleway
 Ladywood Circus
 Junction with A457
 Icknield Street
 (Heaton Street, a road which connects the A4540 to Hockley Circus and the junction with the A41)
 Boulton Middleway
 Lucas Circus
 New John Street West
 Junction with A34 Newtown Row
 Newtown Middleway
 Dartmouth Circus

Heaton Street and New John Street are both numbered A4540 and was the route for all traffic using the Ring Road prior to the construction of the underpass through Snow Hill.

Pedestrian facilities
All but four of the numbered A4540 junctions have signal-controlled pedestrian crossings of the ring road. Of the four, Dartmouth Circus, Ashted Circus and Five Ways have subways; Bordesley Circus has uncontrolled pedestrian crossings despite often heavy traffic. There are mostly lightly used pavements around the entire ring road, though several busy side roads joining the ring road have only uncontrolled crossings for pedestrians. Some parts of the pavement (and the three subways) are designated cycle paths, but much of the rest of the pavement is used by cyclists illegally to avoid the heavy traffic and frequent roundabouts on the ring road.

Coordinates

See also
Transport in Birmingham

References

Roads in England
Ring roads in the United Kingdom
Transport in Birmingham, West Midlands